Domine, salvum fac regem (Lord, save the King) is a motet which was sung as a de facto royal anthem in France during the Ancien Régime.

The text is taken from the Vulgate translation of Psalm 19, and while its use already existed in medieval France, the motet was composed by Jean Mouton for the coronation of King François I in 1515. It was put to music as a grand motet by Jean-Baptiste Lully, Marin Marais, François Couperin, Henry Desmarest, Michel-Richard Delalande, Louis-Nicolas Clérambault and was made customary at the end of every Mass at the Chapel of Versailles. Marc-Antoine Charpentier has composed 24 Domine salvum fac regem (H.281 to H.305). 

Following the conquest of Quebec, the Catholic population began to sing the prayer for the British monarch, and from there it spread to Catholics in England where it was sung at the end of the principal Mass on Sunday until the liturgical reforms of 1969 (a custom still followed in communities that celebrate the Tridentine Mass). During the reign of Queen Elizabeth II, the wording used was Domine, salvam fac reginam nostram Elisabeth.

Lyrics
The original lyrics were written in Latin.

See also
 God Save the King, one of the songs inspired by the anthem.
 The Prayer of Russians, for an anthem-prayer for the Tsar of Russia.
 Heil dir im Siegerkranz, anthem used for the Kaiser of the German Empire.

References

External links
 A video of the royal anthem
 Another rendition of the royal anthem

Ancien Régime
European anthems
French anthems
French monarchy
Historical national anthems
Royal anthems
French patriotic songs